The Square is a public square in Bournemouth Town Centre that marks the centre of Bournemouth, England. The Square separates the Central Gardens from the Lower Gardens.

History

In the 18th century Decoy Pond House stood at the point where a plank was used to cross the Bourne Steam on the track from Poole to Christchurch. The River Bourne still flows under the Square.

In 1848 composer Hubert Parry was born next door to The Square and is marked with a blue plaque.

In 1925, a tram shelter was built at the center of the Square, with a clock on the top, which was given by Captain HB Norton, a magistrate and former Councillor.

The Square later became a large roundabout, with the clock being relocated into a clock tower at the roundabout's centre. By this time the clock tower had become known as the "Leaning Tower of Bournemouth".

The roundabout was removed in October 1992, and since 2000 the square has been almost totally pedestrianised. The old clocktower is now the site of the Obscura Café, so called because it once incorporated a functioning camera obscura, and the clock was installed at the top of the cafe.

Stores
 Debenhams - Formerly Bobby & Co.
 Sports Direct-(Formerly JJB Sports)
 M&S
 Primark-(Formerly BHS)
 Beales
 House of Fraser-(Formerly Dingles)
 WHSmith
 Waterstones
 TK Maxx
 Wilko
 River Island
 H&M

References

Buildings and structures in Bournemouth
Geography of Bournemouth
Squares in England